Heinrich von Poser (23 August 1599 – 13 September 1661) was a German traveler, who wrote a detailed travelogue of his travel to India through Iran.

References

1599 births
1661 deaths
German explorers
German travel writers
17th-century travelers
German expatriates in India